In the field of ordinary differential equations, the Picone identity, named after Mauro Picone, is a classical result about homogeneous linear second order differential equations. Since its inception in 1910 it has been used with tremendous success in association with an almost immediate proof of the Sturm comparison theorem, a theorem whose proof took up many pages in Sturm's original memoir of 1836. It is also useful in studying the oscillation of such equations and has been generalized to other type of differential equations and difference equations.

The Picone identity is used to prove the Sturm–Picone comparison theorem.

Picone identity 
Suppose that u and v are solutions of the two homogeneous linear second order differential equations in self-adjoint form

and

Then, for all x with v(x) ≠ 0, the following identity holds

Proof

Notes

References 

Ordinary differential equations
Mathematical identities